The Cartago Agrarian Union Party is a political party in Cartago Province, Costa Rica.

The party was founded in 1969 by Juan Guillermo Brenes Castillo. It first contested a general election in 1970, but received only 0.5% of the vote and failed to win a seat. In 1974 support for the party more than doubled, receiving 1.2% of the vote and winning its first seat. Despite seeing its share of the vote drop to 1%, the party retained its seat in the 1978 elections. However a further slump to 0.8% in 1982 saw the party lose its parliamentary representation.

It regained a seat in the 1986 elections, receiving 1.2% of the national vote. The seat was retained in elections in 1990 and 1994, but a loss of support in the 1998 elections saw its share of the vote drop to 0.5%, resulting in it losing its solitary seat. A similar result in 2002 saw the party remaining seatless.

References

External links
Cartago Agrarian Union Party TSE

1969 establishments in Costa Rica
Agrarian parties in Costa Rica
Political parties established in 1969
Political parties in Costa Rica